The 2013–14 Biathlon World Cup – Mass start Women started on Sunday January 5 in Oberhof and finished on Sunday March 23 in Holmenkollen. Defending titlist was Tora Berger of Norway.

2012-13 Top 3 Standings

Medal winners

Standings

Mass start Women